Sport Club São Paulo, commonly referred to as São Paulo-RS, is a Brazilian football club based in Rio Grande, Rio Grande do Sul. It currently plays in Campeonato Gaúcho Série A2, the second level of the Rio Grande do Sul state football league.

They competed in the Série A three times.

History
Sport Club São Paulo were founded on October 4, 1908, by Adolpho Corrêa and other young sportsmen. The club were named São Paulo after Adolpho Corrêa's home city. São Paulo won their first title, which was the Campeonato Gaúcho, in 1933. They won the Copa Bento Gonçalves in 1985.

The club competed in the Série A three times. São Paulo's first participation was in 1979, when they finished in the 42nd place. The club competed again in 1980, finishing in the 41st place. They competed for the last time in 1982, when they ended in the 31st place in the league.

On 6 October 2021 William Ribeiro was charged with attempted murder after kicking a referee in the head during a league match against Guarani after Rodrigo Crivellaro awarded a foul against him on 4 October 2021.

Stadium
São Paulo play their home games at Estádio Aldo Dapuzzo. The stadium has a maximum capacity of 10,000 people.

Current squad
As of 22 January 2018.

Achievements
 Campeonato Gaúcho:
 Winners (1): 1933
Campeonato Gaúcho Série A2:
 Winners (2): 1967, 1970
 Copa Bento Gonçalves:
 Winners (1): 1985

Derby
The derby between São Paulo and Rio Grande is known as Rio-Rita.

References

External links 
  Official website

 
Association football clubs established in 1908
Football clubs in Rio Grande do Sul
1908 establishments in Brazil